Death Alive is a live album by American hardcore punk band Death by Stereo. The CD was recorded live at Chain Reaction in Anaheim, California during the Into the Valley of the Death tour. It was originally to be recorded to be given away free with an issue of Law of Inertia Magazine. However, when the band realized that many of their fans did not have a copy of the CD (few fans bought the magazine, also went out of print a few years back), they decided to re-release it with Reignition Records on March 13, 2007.

Track listing

Band line-up
 Efrem Schulz - vocals
 Dan Palmer - lead guitar, backing vocals
 Jim Miner - rhythm guitar, backing vocals
 Paul Miner - bass, backing vocals
 Todd Hennig - drums, backing vocals

References

Death by Stereo live albums
2007 live albums